The year 1680 in music involved some significant events.

Events
Arcangelo Corelli begins his friendship with Cristiano Farinelli.
Antonio Stradivari sets up his own business in Cremona.
John Blow is forced out of his job as organist at Westminster Abbey, to make room for Henry Purcell.
Georg Muffat goes to Italy to study organ with Bernardo Pasquini.
Johann Philipp Krieger becomes Kapellmeister of the court at Weissenfels.
First record of the marimba in Guatemala.

Publications
Denis Gaultier – Livres de tablature des pièces de luth
Ennemond Gaultier
Livre de musique pour le luth contenant une métode
Pièces de luth en musique avec des règles pour les toucher parfaitement sur le luth, et sur le clavessin

Classical music
Heinrich Biber – Mensa sonora
Dieterich Buxtehude – Membra Jesu Nostri
Marc-Antoine Charpentier 
Filius prodigus
Leçon de ténèbres du Vendredi saint, H.105
Laudate pueri Dominum, H.203
Concert pour 4 parties de violes, H.545
Ennemond Gaultier – Suite in D minor 
Johann Caspar Horn – Geistliche Harmonien
Charles Mouton – Pièces de luth sur différents modes
Henry Purcell 
Beati omnes qui timent Dominum, Z.131
Fantasias and In Nomines, Z.732-747
Pavane and Chaconne in G minor, Z.752 (Pavane) and Z.730 (Chaconne)
12 Sonatas of Three Parts, Z.790-801
Sebastian Anton Scherer – 14 Sonatas, Op.3
Johann Heinrich Schmelzer – Lamento sopra la morte di Ferdinand III (Published in the Rost Codex)
Giovanni Battista Vitali – Partite sopra diverse sonate

Opera
Pietro Simone Agostini – Il ratto delle Sabine
Jean-Baptiste Lully – Proserpine
Antonio Sartorio – La Flora
Alessandro Scarlatti – L'honestà negli amoriBirths
April 19 – Johann Friedrich Helbig, hymnist (died 1722)
May 6 – Jean-Baptiste Stuck, cellist and composer (died 1755)
September 29 – Christian Friedrich Hunold, librettist (died 1721)
November 18 (baptised) – Jean-Baptiste Loeillet, composer (died 1730)
December 11 – Emanuele d'Astorga, composer (died 1736)date unknown 
Louis de Caix d'Hervelois, composer (died 1759) 
François Campion, guitarist and composer
Giovanni Antonio Guido, violinist and composer (died 1729)

Deaths
March 20 – Johann Heinrich Schmelzer, violinist (born 1623)
April 1 – David Denicke, hymnist (b. 1603)
May 31 – Joachim Neander, hymn-writer (b. 1650)
September 10 – Baldassare Ferri, castrato singer (born 1610)
October 13
Lelio Colista, composer and lutenist (b. 1629)
François Roberday, organist and composer (b. 1624)
November 27 – Athanasius Kircher, composer and polymath (born 1602)
December 10 – Marco Uccellini, violinist and composer
December 30 – Antonio Sartorio, composer (born 1630)date unknown''
Kancherla Gopanna, composer of Carnatic music (born c.1620)
Maria Francesca Nascinbeni, composer (born c.1640)
Francisco de Trillo y Figueroa, poet and lyricist (born 1618)

 
17th century in music
Music by year